Aleem Dar and Daryl Harper are among the 16 officials who will share umpiring duties during the ICC World Twenty20.

The ICC has announced the umpire and match referee appointments for the group stages of the World Twenty20.

Umpiring duties will be shared by all 12 members of the elite panel - Mark Benson, Billy Bowden, Aleem Dar, Steve Davis, Asoka de Silva, Billy Doctrove, Ian Gould, Daryl Harper, Tony Hill, Rudi Koertzen, Asad Rauf and Simon Taufel - along with Nigel Llong, Marais Erasmus, Amish Saheba and Rod Tucker.

The match referees’ responsibilities throughout the tournament will be shared between Ranjan Madugalle, Chris Broad and Alan Hurst.

Appointments have also been made for the men's and women's warm-up matches at Lord's, The Oval and Trent Bridge from June 1–3.

World Twenty20 warm-up matches
June 1: Ireland v Netherlands, Lord's: Rod Tucker and Marais Erasmus; Steve Malone (third)
June 1: Australia v Bangladesh, Trent Bridge: Amish Saheba and Nigel Llong; Andy Hicks (third)
June 1: India v New Zealand, Lord's: Rod Tucker and Marais Erasmus; Steve Malone (third)
June 1: Pakistan v South Africa, Trent Bridge: Amish Saheba and Nigel Llong; Andy Hicks (third)
June 2: Bangladesh v Sri Lanka, Trent Bridge: Amish Saheba and Nigel Llong; Steve Gale (third)
June 2: Ireland v West Indies, the Brit Oval: Rod Tucker and Marais Erasmus; Steve O'Shaughnessy (third)
June 2: England v Scotland, Trent Bridge: Amish Saheba and Nigel Llong; Steve Gale (third)
June 2: Australia v New Zealand, the Brit Oval: Rod Tucker and Marais Erasmus; Steve O'Shaughnessy (third)
June 3: Sri Lanka v South Africa, Lord's: Tony Hill and Simon Taufel; Marais Erasmus (third)
June 3: Netherlands v Scotland, the Brit Oval: Billy Bowden and Daryl Harper; Asad Rauf (third)
June 3: England v West Indies, Lord's: Asoka de Silva and Steve Davis; Tony Hill (third)
June 3: India v Pakistan, the Brit Oval: Asad Rauf and Billy Doctrove, Rod Tucker (third)

World Twenty20 group stages
June 5: England v Netherlands, Lord's: Steve Davis and Asoka de Silva; Tony Hill (third); Marais Erasum (fourth); Alan Hurst (referee)
June 6: New Zealand v Scotland, the Brit Oval: Daryl Harper and Billy Doctrove; Rudi Koertzen (third); Mark Benson (fourth); Ranjan Madugalle (referee)
June 6: Australia v West Indies, the Brit Oval: Asad Rauf and Aleem Dar; Mark Benson (third); Rod Tucker (fourth); Ranjan Madugalle (referee)
June 6: Bangladesh v India, Trent Bridge: Simon Taufel and Billy Bowden; Nigel Llong (third); Ian Gould (fourth); Chris Broad (referee)
June 7: Scotland v South Africa, the Brit Oval: Asad Rauf and Amish Saheba; Daryl Harper (third); Billy Doctrove (fourth); Ranjan Madugalle (referee)
June 7: England v Pakistan, the Brit Oval: Daryl Harper and Billy Doctrove; Amish Saheba (third); Asad Rauf (fourth); Ranjan Madugalle (referee)
June 8: Bangladesh v Ireland, Trent Bridge: Simon Taufel and Nigel Llong; Ian Gould (third); Asad Rauf (fourth); Chris Broad (referee)
June 8: Australia v Sri Lanka, Trent Bridge: Billy Bowden and Ian Gould; Nigel Llong (third); Billy Bowden (fourth); Chris Broad (referee)
June 9: Netherland v Pakistan, Lord's: Amish Saheba and Billy Doctrove; Daryl Harper (third); Simon Taufel (fourth); Alan Hurst (referee)
June 9: New Zealand v South Africa, Lord's: Asad Rauf and Daryl Harper; Amish Saheba (third); Billy Doctrove (fourth); Alan Hurst (referee)
June 10: Sri Lanka v West Indies, Trent Bridge: Billy Bowden and Simon Taufel; Ian Gould (third); Nigel Llong (fourth); Chris Broad (referee)
June 10: India v Ireland, Trent Bridge: Nigel Llong and Ian Gould; Billy Bowden (third); Simon Taufel (fourth); Chris Broad (referee)

Women’s World Twenty20 warm-up matches
June 8: England v New Zealand, Kings College: Steve Davis and Marais Erasmus; Tony Hill (third)
June 8: South Africa v Sri Lanka, Taunton Vale: Aleem Dar and Mark Benson; Rudi Koertzen (third)
June 8: Australia v India, Kings College: Tony Hill and Marais Erasmus; Asoka de Silva (third)
June 8: Pakistan v West Indies, Taunton Vale: Aleem Dar and Rudi Koertzen; Rod Tucker (third)
June 9: Pakistan v South Africa, King College: Mark Benson and Tony Tucker; Rudi Koertzen (third)
June 9: India v New Zealand, Taunton Vale: Steve Davis and Asoka de Silva; Tony Hill (third)
June 9: Sri Lanka v West Indies, Kings College: Aleem Dar and Rudi Koertzen; Rod Tucker (third)
June 9: Australia v England, Taunton Vale: Asoka de Silva and Marais Erasmus; Steve Davis (third)

Women’s World Twenty20 group stages
June 11: South Africa v West India, Taunton: Asad Rauf and Amish Saheba; Daryl Harper (third); Ranjan Madugalle (referee)
June 11: India v England, Taunton: Daryl Harper and Billy Doctrove; Asad Rauf (third); Ranjan Madugalle (referee)
June 12: Australia v New Zealand, Taunton: Nigel Llong and Ian Gould; Billy Bowden (third); Ranjan Madugalle (referee)
June 12: Pakistan v Sri Lanka, Taunton: Billy Bowden and Nigel Llong; Ian Gould (third); Ranjan Madugalle (referee)
June 13: New Zealand v West Indies, Taunton: Simon Taufel and Nigel Llong; Billy Bowden (third); Chris Broad (referee)
June 13: India v Pakistan, Taunton: Billy Bowden and Simon Taufel; Ian Gould (referee); Chris Broad (referee)
June 14: Australia v West Indies, Taunton: Asad Rauf and Amish Saheba; Daryl Harper (third); Chris Broad (referee)
June 14: England v Sri Lanka, Taunton: Daryl Harper and Billy Doctrove; Asad Rauf (third); Chris Broad (referee)
June 15: New Zealand v South Africa, Taunton: Amish Saheba and Daryl Harper; Billy Doctrove (third); Alan Hurst (referee)
June 15: India v Sri Lanka, Taunton: Billy Doctrove and Asad Rauf; Amish Saheba (third); Alan Hurst (referee)
June 16 Australia v South Africa, Taunton: Tony Hill and Asoka de Silva; Amish Saheba (third); Alan Hurst (referee)
June 16: England v Pakistan, Taunton: Tony Hill and Asoka de Silva; Marais Erasmus (third); Alan Hurst (referee)

2009 ICC World Twenty20